Reservoir Dog is the seventh album by rapper Schoolly D. The album was released in 1995 via PSK Records and was produced by Schoolly D and Grizz Bear & Devine. Reviews were mostly positive; however, like his previous albums, the album was a commercial failure and did not chart on any album charts. The album featured one single, “Nigger Entertainment.”

Track listing
“Welcome to Funkadelica”
“Nigger Entertainment”
“Reservoir Dog”
“Big Fat Bytches”
“Ghettofunkstylistic”
“Hustler Life”
“Gotta Hustle to Survive”
“Date With Death”
“If You See My Little Brother”
“Schoolly-D Live”
“Eternity”

References

1995 albums
Schoolly D albums